Jacco Eltingh and Paul Haarhuis were the defending champions but lost in the final 3–6, 6–4, 6–3 against Sébastien Lareau and Alex O'Brien.

Seeds
Champion seeds are indicated in bold text while text in italics indicates the round in which those seeds were eliminated. All eight seeded teams received byes into the second round.

Draw

Final

Top half

Bottom half

References
 1996 Eurocard Open Doubles Draw

Doubles